The 1987 Volvo Tennis Los Angeles was a men's tennis tournament played on outdoor hard courts at the Los Angeles Tennis Center in Los Angeles, California in the United States that was part of the 1987 Volvo Grand Prix circuit. It was the 61st edition of the Pacific Southwest tournament and was held from September 21 through September 27, 1987. Third-seeded David Pate won the singles title and earned $50,000 first-prize money.

Finals

Singles
 David Pate defeated  Stefan Edberg 6–4, 6–4
 It was Pate's 1st singles title of the year and the 2nd and last of his career.

Doubles
 Kevin Curren /  David Pate defeated  Brad Gilbert /  Tim Wilkison 6–3, 6–4

See also
 1987 Virginia Slims of Los Angeles – women's tournament

References

Los Angeles Open (tennis)
Volvo Tennis Los Angeles
Volvo Tennis Los Angeles
Volvo Tennis Los Angeles
Volvo Tennis Los Angeles